Ottawa South is a federal electoral district in Ottawa, Ontario, Canada. It is represented in the House of Commons of Canada by David McGuinty, brother of former Premier of Ontario and Ottawa South MPP Dalton McGuinty. It has been held continuously by Liberal candidates since it was first contested in 1988, and is regarded as one of the strongest Liberal ridings in Canada. Ottawa South is a suburban, generally middle class riding, notable for having the highest Arab population in Ontario.

Geography
The riding is located within the city of Ottawa.  It is bounded on the north and east by Highway 417, on the west by the Rideau River and on the south by a line beginning at the Rideau River and Hunt Club Road, then east to Limebank Road, south to Leitrim Road, east to the CP Rail line, north to Lester Road, then east along Lester and Davidson Road to Conroy Road, north to Hunt Club Road and east along Hunt Club and its prolongation to Highway 417.  Neighbouring districts include Ottawa—Vanier to the north, Orléans to the east, Carleton to the south and Ottawa West—Nepean and Ottawa Centre to the west.

Ottawa South comprises the neighbourhoods of Riverview, Eastway Gardens, Alta Vista, Riverside Park, Billings Bridge, Heron Park, Mooney's Bay, Hunt Club Woods, Hunt Club Estate, Hunt Club Chase, South Keys, Ellwood, Heron Gate, Sheffield Glen, Airport-Uplands, Elizabeth Park, Windsor Park Village, and Blossom Park in the city of Ottawa. The total area is 76 km2. There are 233 polling divisions.

Party support
The Liberal Party has held the riding since its creation in 1988. The closest election was a 7% Liberal win in 2006. The riding has voted Liberal even during Progressive Conservative and Conservative governments. 
The New Democratic Party received its greatest level of support in the 2021 election at 19%. The Greens saw their highest vote here in 2008 with 7%.

Political geography

The Liberals have support in most parts of the riding. In the 2004 election, the strongest Liberal areas were in the Alta Vista neighbourhood. However, in the 2006 election, they lost some of this support, but it was gained from lower income areas such as Heron Gate. By 2008, the Liberals had gained much of their support back in Alta Vista.

The Conservatives have their strongest amount in the southern parts of the riding, especially in the community of Blossom Park and around the Macdonald-Cartier International Airport By 2006, the Conservatives had won the neighbourhood of Elmvale Acres, but this was lost in 2008.  The New Democrats have only won one poll in recent memory, and that was a poll in Heron Gate in 2004.

Demographics
According to the Canada 2021 Census

Ethnic groups: 52.2% White, 14.7% Black, 12.4% Arab, 4.9% South Asian, 3.6% Indigenous, 3.3% Chinese, 2.2% Filipino, 1.8% Latin American, 1.6% West Asian, 1.2% Southeast Asian, 
Languages: 51.1% English, 10.6% French, 9.7% Arabic, 2.1% Somali, 1.8% Spanish, 1.5% Mandarin, 1.0% Italian, 1.0% Tagalog 
Religions: 51.1% Christian (28.0% Catholic, 3.4% Anglican, 3.1% Christian Orthodox, 2.7% United Church, 1.3% Pentecostal, 12.6% Other), 18.1% Muslim, 1.6% Hindu, 1.1% Jewish, 25.9% None
Median income: $42,000 (2020)
Average income: $55,600 (2020)

Member of Parliament
The Member of Parliament (MP) for Ottawa South is David McGuinty, a former businessman, immigration officer, lawyer and professor. He was first elected in 2004. He is a member of the Liberal Party of Canada.

Riding associations

Riding associations are the local branches of national political parties:

The list of registered riding associations is available from Elections Canada.

History
The district was created in 1987. 65.7% was from Ottawa—Carleton, 20.1% from Ottawa Centre and 14.2% from Ottawa—Vanier. At the time, it was bounded on the west by the Rideau River, on the north by the Queensway, on the east by the city limits at the time, and on the south by the following line (from west to east beginning at the Rideau River): Ottawa city limits, River Road, Limebank Road, Leitrim Road, Canadian Pacific Railway, Lester Road (allowance for a road between lots 10 and 11, Concession 3 in Gloucester Township, Albion Road, Walkley Road,

Following the 1996 redistribution, the riding added the neighbourhood of Hunt Club Park from Carleton—Gloucester, by changing the changing the southeastern boundary to the city limits at the time (from Walkley to Conroy).

Following the 2003 redistribution, the riding's eastern boundary was changed to Highway 417 from the former city limits. The boundary would follow Highway 417 from the Rideau River until Hunt Club Road. This shift added in a small piece of territory that was in Ottawa—Vanier and Ottawa—Orléans riding.

Only a minor change to the riding's boundaries occurred following the 2012 redistribution of Canada's ridings. Ottawa South lost all of its territory south of Hunt Club Road and West of Riverside Drive. This area, which only had 27 people as of the Canada 2011 Census will be transferred to the new riding of Carleton.

Members of Parliament

The riding has elected the following Members of Parliament:

Election results

2021
Incumbent Liberal MP David McGuinty faced a re-match against local businessman Eli Tannis of the Conservative Party. The NDP ran national security expert Huda Mukbil. McGuinty easily won re-election with a slightly reduced majority, while the NDP had its strongest federal result in the riding's history, besting its prior high-water mark in 2011.

2019
Incumbent MP David McGuinty ran for re-election, and was challenged by Conservative Eli Tannis, a Lebanese-Canadian entrepreneur, New Democrat Morgan Gay, a community organizer and Green Les Schram, a self employed consultant.  Despite winning 5,000 fewer votes than he had four years earlier, he easily held off the challenge from his nearest (Conservative) rival, with more than double the latter's total.

2015
While the Liberals were the third party in Parliament, David McGuinty served as the Liberal Party's critic for Natural Resources (2011-2012), Industry (2013) and the Privy Council Office (2013-2015). He was easily re-elected in 2015 when the Liberals were swept into power. He defeated the Conservative candidate, Dev Balkissoon, a consulting firm owner by over 23,000 votes. Balkissoon was criticized during the campaign for missing an all-candidates debate. The NDP candidate was George Brown, a former Ottawa City councillor for Riverside Ward (1985-1994), and the Green candidate was John Redins, a disabilities rights activist.

2011
While in opposition, McGuinty was promoted to the position of the Official Opposition House leader. Once again, he faced and defeated Elie Salibi, the Conservative candidate. McGuinty was one of only 34 Liberals elected to the House of Commons in the election, and both he and Salibi saw a reduction in their percentage of votes. The NDP candidate, James McLaren, a teacher, had the second best (after 2021) performance for the NDP in riding history, despite a mid-campaign controversy regarding comments he made on Facebook.

2008

In opposition, McGuinty served as the Liberal Party's environment critic. He faced nominal opposition from three lesser-known candidates. The Conservative candidate was Elie Salibi, the director of international sales with Corel, who was born in Lebanon. The NDP candidate was Hijal De Sarkar, a Carleton University political science student of Bengali descent. The Green candidate was Qais Ghanem, a doctor, born in Yemen. Former Libertarian Party leader Jean-Serge Brisson also ran, as well as Al Gullon, the Progressive Canadian candidate.  Facing lower turnout in the riding itself, as well as nationwide, and a strong lack of enthusiasm for the Liberal leader Stéphane Dion, McGuinty was able to increase his vote total, and his lead over his closest opponent, from the 2006 election.  McGuinty just barely missed the 50% mark, but was nonetheless re-elected handily in Ottawa South.

Nomination contests

2006

David McGuinty was re-elected after two years as a Liberal backbencher. The race was expected to be closer than 2004, which it was, as McGuinty faced a tough challenge from Conservative Allan Cutler. Cutler was the whistleblower in the Liberal Sponsorship Scandal which saw millions of dollars of public funds transferred to Liberal friendly firms in Quebec during the Chrétien era. The margin of victory between the liberal and his conservative challenger was closer than in 2004, but McGuinty eventually came out on top. Cutler himself was painted as a hypocrite as he would not address the issue of his nomination. Accusations started that 2004 candidate Alan Riddell was given $50,000 not to stand for nomination in the race. Riddell was also pushed aside in an earlier nomination race that saw former MP Barry Turner acclaimed, but would later drop out, forcing a new race. Running for the NDP was the Lebanese-born economist Henri Sader who faced a difficult challenge holding on to the votes that Monia Mazigh won in the previous election. Running again for Greens again was John Ford who failed to hold on to his votes, and running for the Progressive Canadian Party again was Brad Thomson who lost votes as well. Thomson had all but dropped out however, endorsing McGuinty. The Marijuana Party planned to run Tim Meehan, but he did not gain ballot access.

|- bgcolor="white"
|align="right" colspan=3|Difference
|align="right"|4,124
|align="right"|6.71
|align="right"|-2.29
|- bgcolor="white"
|align="right" colspan=3|Rejected Ballots
|align="right"|298
|align="right"|0.5
|align="right"|-0.1
|- bgcolor="white"
|align="right" colspan=3|Turnout
|align="right"|61,808
|align="right"|71.71
|align="right"|+2.00
|- bgcolor="white"

Nomination contests

Barry Turner was acclaimed for the nomination when Allan Riddell, the party's candidate in 2004, withdrew because of allegations about a prank in which he was involved in university. The party later cancelled Turner's nomination and called a new meeting. Turner was not able to get an answer from the party about why the nomination was cancelled, and decided against seeking the nomination again. Allan Cutler announced that he would seek the nomination.

2004

The riding's boundaries had very little change. 99.7% of the riding remained intact, taking 0.3% from Ottawa-Vanier. John Manley retired prior to the 2004 election. He was among a number of high-profile Liberals to retire who were known to be Jean Chrétien loyalists. David McGuinty, a lawyer and brother of Ontario Premier Dalton McGuinty, won the Liberal nomination. He was known to be a friend of Prime Minister Paul Martin. McGuinty faced a steep challenge from Alan Riddell, another lawyer, and Monia Mazigh, the NDP candidate. Riddell, the Conservative candidate, had suffered bad press when it was discovered he had been driving with a suspended license. Mazigh, who lived in Nepean, was another high-profile candidate, being the wife of Maher Arar, who was wrongly accused of terrorism. McGuinty suffered too, as his brother's government was unpopular at the time, but in the end was victorious.

|- bgcolor="white"
|align="right" colspan=3|Difference
|align="right"|5,334
|align="right"|8.95
|align="right"|-17.9
|- bgcolor="white"
|align="right" colspan=3|Rejected Ballots
|align="right"|361
|align="right"|0.61
|align="right"|+0.2
|- bgcolor="white"
|align="right" colspan=3|Turnout
|align="right"|59,591
|align="right"|69.67
|align="right"|+7.7
|- bgcolor="white"

^Change from 2000 is not based on redistributed results. Conservative Party change is based on the combination of Canadian Alliance and Progressive Conservative Party totals from the 2000 election.

Results by neighbourhood

Nomination contests

2000
By 2000, Manley had progressed to Minister of Foreign Affairs. He defeated Brad Darbyson, the Canadian Alliance candidate, who was an investment counsellor. Finishing in third was engineer Kevin Lister, the Progressive Conservative candidate and native Albertan.

|- bgcolor="white"
|align="right" colspan=3|Difference
|align="right"|13,908
|align="right"|26.9
|align="right"|-16.3
|- bgcolor="white"
|align="right" colspan=3|Rejected Ballots
|align="right"|231
|align="right"|0.4
|align="right"|-0.3
|- bgcolor="white"
|align="right" colspan=3|Turnout
|align="right"|52,021
|align="right"|62.0
|align="right"|-10.3
|- bgcolor="white"

|align="left" colspan=2|Liberal hold
|align="right"|Swing
|align="right"|-8.2
|align="right"|-3.8

^ Canadian Alliance change compares to the vote total for the Reform Party candidate in 1997.

1997
Before the 1997 election, the riding changed its boundaries slightly. The old 1987 version encompassed 95% of the new 1996 version. The remaining 5% came from nearby Carleton-Gloucester. John Manley, now the Minister of Industry was once again re-elected. He faced opposition from the Somali community in the riding for his indifference to their needs and concerns. This did not have enough impact, however, and Manley won again with another massive majority. He defeated Carla Marie Dancey, the Reform Party candidate who lived outside the riding. Also running was Keith Beardsley, a staffer to MP Gerry Weiner. Many attribute Manley's victory to attracting business to Ottawa's high tech sector.

|- bgcolor="white"
|align="right" colspan=3|Difference
|align="right"|23,203
|align="right"|43.2
|align="right"|-8.7

|- bgcolor="white"

|align="left" colspan=2|Liberal hold
|align="right"|Swing
|align="right"|-4.4
|align="right"|-23.5

1993
Manley was re-elected, as part of a landslide victory for the opposition Liberals. He defeated consulting engineer Doug Walkinshaw of the Reform Party. Joe Anton, the Progressive Conservative candidate, an auditor for Revenue Canada defeated the former mayor of Kanata for the Tory nomination. Ursule Critoph, an economist, was the NDP candidate.

|- bgcolor="white"

|align="left" colspan=2|Liberal hold
|align="right"|Swing
|align="right"|+19.1
|align="right"|+7.0

1988

Barry Turner was the Progressive Conservative incumbent MP going into the 1988 election. He had previously been the MP for the Ottawa—Carleton riding. As an MP, Turner had a reputation as a hard working MP. However, he would end up being defeated by John Manley, a lawyer with a specialty in tax law. Many  attribute the loss to a phone and mail campaign by the Public Service Alliance of Canada, which was upset at the Progressive Conservative Government's cuts to the civil service.

^ Change based on redistributed results.

See also
 List of Canadian federal electoral districts

References

Notes

External links
 Elections Canada (source of campaign expense data)
 Politwitter
 Project Democracy
 Pundit's Guide
 StatsCan District Profile

Federal electoral districts of Ottawa
Ontario federal electoral districts
1987 establishments in Ontario